Rolleston is a small village and civil parish in Nottinghamshire by the River Greet (a tributary of the River Trent), a few miles from Southwell not far from the Trent and about  southwest of Newark. The population of the civil parish at the 2011 census was 312. It has a church dedicated to the Holy Trinity. It lies close to the railway line between Nottingham and Lincoln with a station serving the village and Southwell as well as the nearby Southwell Racecourse.

The church is an ancient structure, dedicated to the Holy Trinity, with a tower and four bells. The living, a vicarage, is valued in the King's books at £10 1s 3d, now £246. The Chapter of Southwell are patrons, and the Rev. Robert Fowler incumbent. The vicarage, a neat brick house near the church, was built in 1844. John Henry Manners Sutton Esq. M.P. is lessee of the great tithe, under the Chapter of Southwell, lord of the manor, and principal owner. The poor have the interest of £130, bequeathed by Sir Thomas Lodge, Diana Gibson, Luke Williamson and Nicholas Kirkby."

Notes

External links

  Rolleston – The Village of Little Kate Greenaway in: Arthur Mee, The King's England: Nottinghamshire, Publisher: Hodder & Stoughton, 1938

Newark and Sherwood
Villages in Nottinghamshire